is a railway station on the Hōhi Main Line operated by JR Kyushu in Ōzu, Kumamoto, Japan.

Lines

Layout 
The station consists of two side platforms serving two tracks at grade with a siding. The station building is a small. modern, concrete structure which serves only as a waiting room. Access to the opposite side platform is by means of a level crossing.

Adjacent stations

History
On the same day, Seta was opened as an intermediate station on the new track. Through-traffic was established between Kumamoto and Ōita. The two lines were merged and the entire stretch redesignated as the Hōhi Main Line. With the privatization of Japanese National Railways (JNR), the successor of JGR, on 1 April 1987, the station came under the control of JR Kyushu.

JR Kyushu has commenced repair work, starting first with the sector from Higo-Ōzu to Tateno but has not announced a targeted completion date. It appears Seta Station was little damaged and most of the serious damage was at various locations on the track from Seta to Tateno and beyond.

See also
List of railway stations in Japan

References

External links
Seta (JR Kyushu)

Railway stations in Kumamoto Prefecture
Railway stations in Japan opened in 1916